The  doubles Tournament at the 2004 Gaz de France Stars took place in late September to early October, 2004, on indoor hard courts in Hasselt, Belgium.

Jennifer Russell and Mara Santangelo won the title.

Seeds
The top two seeds get a bye into round two.

Results

Draw

References

2004 Doubles
2004 WTA Tour
2004 in Belgian tennis
Sport in Hasselt